"Rock'n Me" (also known as "Rock 'N Me" or "Rock 'N' Me") is a song by American rock band Steve Miller Band, released in 1976 from the band's ninth studio album Fly Like an Eagle (1976). It was written by primary band leader and songwriter Steve Miller released as the second single from the album. Miller also produced the song and album. The North American release of the single was generally credited to Steve Miller as a person, while the European release was generally credited to the Steve Miller Band as a whole group.

The song achieved lasting commercial and critical success, with the publication Billboard labeling it "an immediate audience grabber". It became the band's second #1 hit on the US Billboard Hot 100, where it stayed at the top for one week, it also topped the Canadian RPM Top Singles chart. In later years, the song has been included in several compilation albums such as 1978's Greatest Hits 1974–78 and 1991's The Very Best of the Steve Miller Band.

Miller has acknowledged that elements of "Rock'n Me", particularly the intro, was a tip of the hat to English rock band Free particularly the band's only hit song "All Right Now". He stated:

He returned to the subject in an interview with Ultimate Classic Rock Nights, referring to his support slot at Pink Floyd's one-off appearance at Knebworth on June 1975:

Composed for that kind of pop and rock festival atmosphere, the lyrics and vocals have been labeled as having an 'every man' quality to them. It is sung from the point of view of someone frequently traveling while keeping a positive, upbeat attitude. Locations mentioned in the song include the major cities of Phoenix, Arizona; Tacoma, Washington; Philadelphia, Pennsylvania; Atlanta, Georgia; and Los Angeles, California.

Billboard described "Rock'n Me" as a "catchy and highly humorous midtempo rocker," saying that the melody sounds like the Beach Boys and the Eagles in places.  Cash Box said that it "draws from the best of rock ’n' roll over the last ten years" and has "hook-filled guitar lines." Record World said it has "an intro reminiscent of Free's 'All Right Now' and vocals and guitar pure Steve Miller,"

The song is a playable track on the video game Rock Band 2, and featured in Grand Theft Auto V and Tap Tap Revenge 3 for iOS.

Personnel
Steve Miller – guitar, double-tracked lead vocals
Lonnie Turner – bass
Gary Mallaber – drums

Charts

References

1976 songs
1976 singles
Steve Miller Band songs
Capitol Records singles
Billboard Hot 100 number-one singles
Cashbox number-one singles
RPM Top Singles number-one singles
Songs written by Steve Miller (musician)
Song recordings produced by Steve Miller